Astero may refer to:
 Astero (1959 film), a Greek drama film
 Astero (1929 film), a Greek silent film